Ralla is a village in Mansa district of Punjab, India. There is another village known as Joga nearby (5.5 km) and they often are called together Joga Ralla.

Geography 

It is located on the Barnala-Mansa-Sirsa highway no. 13 at only 16 km from Mansa and 33 km from Barnala. The total geographical area of village is 2845 hectares, 7112.5 acres and 28.7832663 square kilometers . Ralla has a total population of 7,832 peoples. There are about 1,546 houses in Ralla village. Mansa is nearest town to Ralla. Aklia, Burj Rathi, Chauke, Joga, Makha Chehlan and Samaon, Tamkot, Ubha, Bhupal are the surrounding villages.

Culture 

All the population speaks Punjabi which is the mother tongue as well as the official language here.

As of religion, Sikhism predominates the village with other minorities.

Micro-hydel power plant 

Ralla has a micro-hydel power plant with the capacity of 0.3 megawatt, not working.

References 

Villages in Mansa district, India